The FIBA 3x3 World Cup is a 3x3 basketball tournament for national teams organized by the International Basketball Federation (FIBA). The debut of the tournament then named as the FIBA 3x3 World Championship was held in August 2012 in Athens, Greece. The current champions are Serbia in the men's division and France in the women's division.

There are two events in the tournament; one for men and another for women. In the first edition, there was a mixed event where each team was composed of 2 men and 2 women.

Men

Summary

Medal table

Participating teams

Women

Summary

Medal table

Participating teams

Mixed

Summary

Medal table

Participating teams

Overall medal table

Individual contests

Dunk contest

Skills contest

Shoot-out contest

Free-throw pursuit

See also
 3x3 basketball
 World Street 3s
   Date The FIBA 3x3 World Cup 2019

References

 
World championships in basketball
3x3 basketball competitions
FIBA competitions between national teams
Recurring sporting events established in 2012